Catharsius is a genus of dung beetles in the tribe Coprini (subfamily Scarabaeinae) in the scarab family.

It contains about 100 species of intermediate to large size, black or brown, living in the tropical areas of the Old World. Tropical Africa contains about 85 species, with the remaining 15 in tropical Asia. Catharsius are typically short and convex scarabs, with horns on head and forebody of males, sometimes also of females.
	
They mostly live in grasslands and pastures, occasionally in forests, where they eat large mammals’ dung, using it to make pedotrophic nests in which their offspring develop. A few species shifted from coprophagy to necrophagy, and use small vertebrates carcasses as food for both adults and larvae.

Due to their rather large size and occasional abundance, Catharsius species play important roles in the ecology and soil dynamics of tropical areas. They bury vast amounts of dung into the ground, thus improving the quality and texture of the soils. Also, they contribute to “clean” the surface of the ground, hence their name (from the Greek katharsios “purifier”).

 Important species are Catharsius molossus (Linnaeus, 1758), one of the most widespread and abundant coprophagous species in tropical Asian regions; C. sesostris Waterhouse, 1888, also coprophagous, widespread and common in savannas and semidesertic zones in Africa and Near East; C. eteocles Laporte, 1840, important necrophagous species in Western Africa, etc. Among less common species, C. mirabilis Felsche, 1901, occasionally abundant in Eastern Africa, displays a strong sexual dimorphism making it one of the most spectacular African dung beetles. Catharsius gorilla is a species widespread in the tropical African regions.

An additional group of some 65, much smaller species, mostly from tropical Africa, is sometimes erected into a separate genus: Metacatharsius Paulian, 1939.

Recently, the name “Catharsius” has been selected by a team of entomologists working on dung beetle fauna of Western Africa.

References
Balthasar (Vladimir), Monographie der Scarabaeidae und Aphodiidae der palaearktischen und orientalischen Region. Czech Academy of Sciences, 1963.
Davis (A.L.V.), Frolov (A.V.), Scholtz (C.H.), The African Dung Beetle Genera. Protea Book House, 2008.
Hanski (I.) and Cambefort (Y.), eds. Dung Beetle Ecology. Princeton University Press, 1991.

External links

Picture of the beetle
http://www.eol.org/pages/16872
Isolation of Escherichia coli O157:H7 from dung beetles Catharsius molossus
http://www.catharsius.fr/

Coprini
Scarabaeidae genera